Aliona Vadimovna Bolsova Zadoinova (born 6 November 1997) is a Spanish-Moldovan tennis player.

On the ITF Junior Circuit, Bolsova had a combined career-high ranking of No. 4, and reached the quarterfinals of the 2015 Australian Open.

Bolsova has career-high WTA rankings of 88 in singles and 54 in doubles. She has won three doubles titles on the WTA Challenger Tour along with eight singles and 13 doubles titles on the ITF Circuit.

Playing for Spain Fed Cup team, Bolsova has a win–loss record of 4–2 in Fed Cup competition.

Personal life
Bolsova moved from Moldova to Spain at a young age. Her father, Vadim Zadoinov, and her mother, Olga Bolșova, were both Olympic athletes, and so were her maternal grandparents, athletes Viktor Bolshov and Valentyna Maslovska. 

She represented Moldova from 2012 to 2013, until she gained Spanish citizenship in 2013.

College career
Bolsova played for Oklahoma State University's tennis team as a freshman in the 2016–17 season in NCAA play. There, her record was 31–7 in singles and 25–7 in doubles. Her tenure included helping OSU's team reach the final of the 2017 Big 12 Conference championship and the quarterfinals of the 2017 NCAA tournament.

In 2018, Bolsova played for Florida Atlantic University, going undefeated in singles with a record of 19–0. In doubles, she went 15–3. Bolsova turned pro following the 2018 Conference USA Championship.

Professional career
At the 2019 French Open, she qualified for the main draw and reached the fourth round on her Grand Slam debut in which she lost to Amanda Anisimova.

Performance timelines

Only main-draw results in WTA Tour, Grand Slam tournaments, Fed Cup/Billie Jean King Cup and Olympic Games are included in win–loss records.

Singles
Current after the 2023 Australian Open.

Doubles
Current after the 2023 Australian Open.

WTA career finals

Doubles: 1 (1 runner-up)

WTA 125 tournament finals

Doubles: 3 (3 titles)

ITF Circuit finals
Bolsova debuted at the ITF Women's World Tennis Tour in 2012 at the $10k event in Coimbra, Portugal. In singles, she has been in 17 finals and has won eight of them, while in doubles, she reached 18 finals and has won 13. In December 2020, she finished runner-up at the $100k Dubai Challenge in the doubles draw.

Singles: 17 (8 titles, 9 runner–ups)

Doubles: 18 (13 titles, 5 runner–ups)

References

External links
 
 
 
 
 Official website 

1997 births
Living people
Spanish female tennis players
Moldovan female tennis players
Spanish people of Moldovan descent
Spanish people of Russian descent
Moldovan expatriates in Spain
Sportspeople from Chișinău
People from Baix Empordà
Sportspeople from the Province of Girona
Naturalised citizens of Spain
Oklahoma State Cowgirls tennis players